The 1983 New York Giants season was the franchise's 59th season in the National Football League (NFL). The Giants finished in last place in the National Football Conference East Division with a 3–12–1 record, the team’s worst record since 1976.

In the 1983 NFL draft, the Giants selected defensive back Terry Kinard in the first round, with the 10th overall pick. The 1983 season was the first for the Giants under Bill Parcells, who had been offered the position after previous head coach Ray Perkins resigned before succeeding Bear Bryant as the coach for the University of Alabama. Parcells named Scott Brunner the team’s starting quarterback, ahead of Phil Simms and Jeff Rutledge; upset with the decision, Simms requested a trade at one point during the season. New York was 2–2 in their first four games of the season, before a three-game losing streak that left the club at 2–5. Against the Philadelphia Eagles in their sixth game, the Giants inserted Simms into their lineup in place of Brunner; shortly afterward, Simms suffered a season-ending injury.

The St. Louis Cardinals hosted the Giants in a matchup on October 24 that the New York Daily News''' Gary Myers later called the worst game in the history of Monday Night Football''. After the Giants lost a lead late in the fourth quarter, the game went into overtime. The Cardinals missed three field goal attempts in the extra period, including two in the final 1:06, and the contest ended in a 20–20 tie. The Giants lost the following three games before a victory in Philadelphia, which was their final win of the season. Losses to the Los Angeles Raiders, St. Louis, Seattle, and Washington left the team’s final record at 3–12–1.

Ali Haji-Sheikh, the Giants' kicker, set a team record for points scored in a season; with 35 field goals and 22 conversions, he was responsible for 127 points. In addition, he set a team record for the longest field goal in a game versus Green Bay, with a 56-yard kick. Earnest Gray had 1,139 receiving yards, becoming the first Giants wide receiver in 15 years to exceed 1,000 yards.

Personnel

Staff

Roster

Schedule

Game summaries

Week 5: San Diego Chargers

Gill Byrd had an interception for San Diego.

Week 13: Los Angeles Raiders

Standings

References

New York Giants
New York Giants seasons
New York Giants season
20th century in East Rutherford, New Jersey
Meadowlands Sports Complex